Selenium hexafluoride is the inorganic compound with the formula SeF6. It is a very toxic colourless gas described as having a "repulsive" odor. It is not widely encountered and has no commercial applications.

Structure, preparation, and reactions
SeF6 has octahedral molecular geometry with an Se−F bond length of 168.8 pm.  In terms of bonding, it is hypervalent.

SeF6 can be prepared from the elements.  It also forms by the reaction of bromine trifluoride (BrF3) with selenium dioxide.  The crude product can be purified by sublimation.

The relative reactivity of the hexafluorides of S, Se, and Te follows the order TeF6 > SeF6 > SF6, the latter being completely inert toward hydrolysis until high temperatures. SeF6 also resists hydrolysis.  The gas can be passed through 10% NaOH or KOH without change, but reacts with gaseous ammonia at 200 °C.

Safety
Although selenium hexafluoride is quite inert and slow to hydrolyze, it is toxic even at low concentrations, especially by longer exposure. In the U.S., OSHA and ACGIH standards for selenium hexafluoride exposure is an upper limit of 0.05 ppm in air averaged over an eight-hour work shift. Additionally, selenium hexafluoride is designated as IDLH chemical with a maximum allowed exposure limit of 2 ppm.

References

External links
 ATSDR ToxFAQs - Selenium Hexafluoride U.S. Department of Health and Human Services
 CDC - NIOSH Pocket Guide to Chemical Hazards U.S. Department of Health and Human Services
 WebBook page for SeF6

Selenium(VI) compounds
Hexafluorides
Octahedral compounds
Chalcohalides
Foul-smelling chemicals